The 1999 Barnsley Metropolitan Borough Council election took place on 6 May 1999 to elect members of Barnsley Metropolitan Borough Council in South Yorkshire, England. Prior to the election, the Liberal Democrats had gained a seat in Wombwell North from Labour. One third of the council was up for election and the Labour party stayed in overall control of the council.

Election result

This resulted in the following composition of the council:

Ward results

+/- figures represent changes from the last time these wards were contested.

By-elections between 1999 and 2000

References

1999 English local elections
1999
1990s in South Yorkshire